is a Japanese speaking Vocaloid by Sony Entertainment for Vocaloid 2. He is based on the Japanese singer Piko. He was used in Samfree's "Night Series", singing the song "Piko Piko Legend of the Night."

Development
His design incorporates aspects of YAMAHA's RGX A2 guitar. A free trial version was released on December 1. The same day his trial was released, Sony demanded that all content made with it be taken down. He was released on December 8, 2010 in download form.

He was later used as reference along with other masculine vocals during the development of VY2.

On August 16, 2020, it was discovered that Piko's voicebank had sold out on the Sony Music website. With no plans for an update, this officially rendered Utatane Piko as a discontinued product.

See also
 List of Vocaloid products

References

Vocaloids introduced in 2010
Fictional singers